UIT may refer to:

Organisations
 International Telecommunication Union, an agency of the United Nations responsible for issues that concern information and communication technologies
 Union International de Tir, a former name of the International Shooting Sport Federation
 University of Tromsø – The Arctic University of Norway, (Universitetet i Tromsø – Norges arktiske universitet or UiT)
 University Institutes of Technology
 Usman Institute of Technology, Karachi, Pakistan
 Ho Chi Minh City University of Information Technology

Other uses
 UIT rail, a standard used for mounting slings and other accessories in competition shooting
 Unit investment trust
 User Interface Toolkit, a C++ application programming interface to Sun's XView
 Ultrasonic impact treatment, a method for surface treatment using ultrasound